Naomichelys is an extinct genus of helochelydrid stem turtle known from the Cretaceous (Aptian-Campanian) of North America. It is the only member of the family known to be native to North America.

Distribution
Naomichelys is known numerous remains from western North America, most notably the holotype partial shell from the Cloverly Formation of Montana and a complete skeleton from the Antlers Formation of Texas. Indetermiate remains are known extending up to the Campanian in the United States and Canada. It is the only known North American member of Helochelydridae.

Location 
After

 Kootenai Formation, Montana, Early Cretaceous (Aptian)
 Arundel Formation, Maryland, Aptian
 Cloverly Formation, Montana and Wyoming, Aptian
 Trinity Group, Texas, Aptian-Albian
 Willow Tank Formation, Nevada, Albian
 Cedar Mountain Formation, Utah, Albian-Cenomanian
 Kaskapau Formation, British Columbia, Turonian
 Straight Cliffs Formation, Utah, Turonian-Santonian
 Tropic Shale, Utah, Turonian-Santonian
 Mooreville Chalk, Alabama, Santonian-Campanian
 Milk River Formation, Alberta, Santonian-Campanian
 Foremost Formation, Campanian 
 Two Medicine Formation, Montana, Campanian
 Mesaverde Formation, Wyoming, Campanian
 Wahweap Formation, Utah, Campanian
 Menefee Formation, New Mexico Campanian

Taxonomy
Naomichelys is a member of the family Helochelydridae, which is known from Late Jurassic to Late Cretaceous deposits in North America and Europe.

References

Fossil taxa described in 1908
Early Cretaceous turtles
Extinct turtles
Testudinata